The 2011–12 Atlas season was the 65th professional season of Mexico's top-flight football league. The season is split into two tournaments—the Torneo Apertura and the Torneo Clausura—each with identical formats and each contested by the same eighteen teams. Puebla began their season on July 23, 2011 against Puebla, Atlas play their homes games on Saturdays at 8:45pm local time.

Torneo Apertura

Squad

 

 
            

  

     
                                                                                    
 

Out on loan:

Regular season

Apertura 2011 results

Atlas did not qualify to the Final Phase

Goalscorers

Results

Results summary

Results by round

Transfers

In

Out

Torneo Clausura

Squad

Regular season

Clausura 2012 results

atlas did not qualify to the Final Phase

Goalscorers

Results

Results summary

Results by round

References

2011–12 Primera División de México season
Mexican football clubs 2011–12 season
Club Atlas seasons